Sunnyside is a historical novel by Glen David Gold.

Synopsis
The novel is about Charlie Chaplin and the rise of Hollywood and celebrity during 1918.

References

2009 American novels
Novels set during World War I
Fiction set in 1918
Hollywood novels
Cultural depictions of Charlie Chaplin
Novels set in the 1910s
American historical novels
Alfred A. Knopf books